Stoyanka Kurbatova (née Gruycheva, born 18 March 1955) is a Bulgarian rower and Olympic champion.

She was born in Plovdiv.

Kurbatova, competing under her maiden name Gruycheva, became Olympic champion in 1976 in the coxless pairs event, with Siyka Kelbecheva. In 1980, she received a bronze medal in the same competition.

References

External links
 

1955 births
Living people
Bulgarian female rowers
Olympic rowers of Bulgaria
Rowers at the 1976 Summer Olympics
Rowers at the 1980 Summer Olympics
Olympic gold medalists for Bulgaria
Olympic bronze medalists for Bulgaria
Olympic medalists in rowing
Sportspeople from Plovdiv
Medalists at the 1980 Summer Olympics
Medalists at the 1976 Summer Olympics